Beverly Hills Cop is a game developed by Tynesoft and released in 1990, with a story loosely based on the first film from the Beverly Hills Cop series. The player takes control of Axel Foley, the main character of the series. There are four distinct sub games including a side-scrolling action game, a driving game, an overhead view shooter and a first person shooter. The game was released on Commodore 64, ZX Spectrum, BBC Micro, Amstrad CPC, Amiga, Atari ST, and MS-DOS. The BBC version only contains the driving game.

Reception 

The reviewers of Zzap!64 thought the Commodore 64 version was not particularly well executed with "passable" graphics and sound, but provided "a lot of variety" making it "quite good value for money".  The overall rating given was 68%.

The game was also reviewed in the magazine The Games Machine. They commented that the game's plot "bears absolutely no relation to the film storyline", the Commodore 64 version was graphically and sonically weak, and the Amiga and Atari ST releases were also poor, with an Axel Foley character that looked more like Daley Thompson.

In 2006, Abandonware website Abandonias Sebatianos reviewed Beverly Hills Cop with "All in all the game is OK, but the animation is far from smooth. You'll have problems reading the text, because it will shake too much and the animation (especially on level one) is very choppy."

References

Beverly Hills Cop (franchise)
1990 video games
Amiga games
Amstrad CPC games
Atari ST games
BBC Micro and Acorn Electron games
Commodore 64 games
DOS games
ZX Spectrum games
Video games about police officers
Video games based on films
Video games developed in the United Kingdom
Video games set in California
Video games featuring black protagonists
Tynesoft games